Events in the year 1995 in Burkina Faso.

Incumbents 

 President: Blaise Compaoré
 Prime Minister: Michel Kafando

Events 

 The Nazi Boni University opens as the Polytechnic University of Bobo-Dioulasso.

Deaths

References 

 
1990s in Burkina Faso
Years of the 20th century in Burkina Faso
Burkina Faso
Burkina Faso